Marian Carr (born Marion Dorice Dunn; July 6, 1926July 30, 2003), sometimes credited as Marion Carr, was an American actress who appeared in a number of films in the late 1940s through the 1950s.

Biography
Carr was born July 6, 1926 in Providence, Kentucky. In her adolescence, she relocated with her family to Chicago, Illinois, where she attended Austin High School.

After graduating high school, Carr worked in an office as well as taking jobs modeling in Chicago. She was spotted by a talent scout and was named "Chicago's Prettiest Office Worker" in 1946. Following this, Carr relocated Los Angeles, where she began acting in local theater productions. She subsequently signed a film contract with RKO Pictures in 1946 under Howard Hughes. She made her feature film debut in San Quentin (1946), followed by a minor part in Frank Capra's It's a Wonderful Life (also 1946). Carr had lead roles in several films, including the Westerns The Devil Thumbs a Ride (1947) and Northern Patrol (1953). After marrying Frederick Levy, an executive for Blum Candy, Carr took a temporary hiatus from acting, and resided in San Francisco, where she gave birth to a son in 1952.

After divorcing Levy in 1954, she returned to acting with supporting roles in Ring of Fear (1954), and two film noir by director Robert Aldrich: World for Ransom (1954) and Kiss Me Deadly (1955), in the latter of which she portrayed the sister of a mobster. Carr appeared in several other films, such as the Western Ghost Town (1956), before making her final feature film appearance in  Nightmare (also 1956) before retiring. Carr later married television producer Lester Linsk in 1958, though the marriage ended in divorce in 1966. She subsequently married Francis Jerome Mason.

Death
Carr died in Palm Desert, California on July 30, 2003.

Filmography

Film

Television

References

Sources

External links

1926 births
2003 deaths
Actresses from Chicago
Actresses from Kentucky
American film actresses
American stage actresses
American television actresses
RKO Pictures contract players
People from Providence, Kentucky
20th-century American actresses
21st-century American women